Baczyna refers to the following places in Poland:

 Baczyna, Lubusz Voivodeship
 Baczyna, Świętokrzyskie Voivodeship